Schaenicoscelis is a genus of South American lynx spiders that was first described by Eugène Louis Simon in 1898.

Species
 it contains seven species, found only in Guyana and Brazil:
Schaenicoscelis concolor Simon, 1898 – Brazil
Schaenicoscelis elegans Simon, 1898 (type) – Brazil
Schaenicoscelis exilis Mello-Leitão, 1930 – Brazil
Schaenicoscelis guianensis Caporiacco, 1947 – Guyana
Schaenicoscelis leucochlora Mello-Leitão, 1929 – Brazil
Schaenicoscelis luteola Mello-Leitão, 1929 – Brazil
Schaenicoscelis viridis Mello-Leitão, 1927 – Brazil

See also
 List of Oxyopidae species

References

Araneomorphae genera
Oxyopidae
Spiders of South America